Borkhar County is in Isfahan province, Iran. The capital of the county is the city of Dowlatabad. It was created from the division of Borkhar and Meymeh County into Borkhar County and Shahin Shahr and Meymeh County. At the 2006 census, the population of Borkhar District within the predecessor county was 95,389 in 24,739 households. The following census in 2011 counted 108,933 people in 31,562 households, by which time the district had been separated from the county to become Borkhar County. At the 2016 census, the county's population was 122,419 in 37,623 households.

Administrative divisions

The population history and structural changes of Borkhar County's administrative divisions over three consecutive censuses are shown in the following table. The latest census shows two districts, four rural districts, and seven cities.

References

 

Counties of Isfahan Province